Stephanie Paige Borowicz is an American politician currently serving as a Republican member of the Pennsylvania House of Representatives for the 76th district since January 1, 2019.  She is the first woman to represent the 76th district.

Early life and education
Borowicz was raised in Orlando, Florida and graduated from Altamonte Christian School in 1995. She received a BA in Liberal Studies with a minor in Bible Studies from Vanguard University in 1999.  She worked as an elementary school teacher and as president of a non-profit organization.  She moved to Clinton County, Pennsylvania in 2009.

Career
Borowicz was elected to the Pennsylvania House of Representatives for the 76th district in 2018, defeating Mike Hanna Jr., the son of Mike Hanna, Sr. who served as state Representative for the 76th district for the previous 30 years.

Borowicz gained national attention when she gave an invocation at the start of a state house session in which she invoked Jesus 13 times, praised Trump, praised Israel, and said, "at the name of Jesus, every knee will bend."  The prayer was given on the same day that Movita Johnson-Harrell was sworn in as the first Muslim woman to serve in the chamber. Johnson-Harrel criticized the invocation as "weaponized prayer" and as an example of Islamophobia.  Borowicz brushed off the criticism in an interview with Todd Starnes on Fox News Radio, saying she prayed in the same manner she always prayed. She claimed that people were offended because "there's power in the name of Jesus."

In May 2019, a man in a shirt with the name and logo of The American Guard took a selfie with Borowicz at a pro-gun rally in Harrisburg, Pennsylvania. This caused some controversy due to The American Guard being an organization "which anti-hate organizations describe as having ties to white supremacists."

She achieved notoriety again when, during the coronavirus pandemic of 2019-2020, she called the virus a "punishment inflicted upon us for our presumptuous sins" and days later amid the crisis called for a state day of humiliation, fasting, and prayer.

After the 2020 Presidential election, Borowicz was one of 26 Pennsylvania House Republicans who called for withdrawing certification of presidential electors, despite there being no evidence of fraud, and despite Joe Biden winning Pennsylvania by over 80,000 votes. This was also after federal appeals brought by the Trump campaign were dismissed due to lack of evidence.

In 2022, Borowicz introduced a bill modeled a after Florida's "Don't Say Gay" law. Her bill would ban discussion of sexual orientation or gender identity in schools through the fifth grade, but Borowicz said the measure should be extended through twelfth grade.  The introduction of her bill came after the Pennsylvania Department of Education launched a webpage containing advice for teachers to create "gender-inclusive classrooms." The bill was referred to the State House's Education Committee, but was never taken up. She reintroduced the bill in 2023.

Personal life
Her husband is a pastor and together they have three sons.

References

External links
PA State Rep. Stephanie Borowicz official PA House website

21st-century American politicians
American women educators
Living people
Republican Party members of the Pennsylvania House of Representatives
People from Clinton County, Pennsylvania
People from Orlando, Florida
Vanguard University alumni
Women state legislators in Pennsylvania
Year of birth missing (living people)
21st-century American women politicians